The Great Intelligence is a fictional character from the British science fiction television series Doctor Who. Although the Great Intelligence has no physical form, it is capable of communicating, both by itself and through possession, with other characters within the series. The Great Intelligence was originally created by Henry Lincoln and Mervyn Haisman and first appeared in the 1967 serial The Abominable Snowmen where it encountered the Second Doctor and his companions Jamie and Victoria. The Great Intelligence tries to form a physical body so as to conquer the Earth, making use of Yeti robots that resemble the cryptozoological creatures. Initially the Great Intelligence used the Yeti robots to scare off curiosity seekers, only later using them as an army. Both the Intelligence and the Yeti returned in its sequel The Web of Fear.

After disagreements arose between Lincoln and Haisman with the BBC in 1968 over their rights to the Great Intelligence and Quarks, the writers departed from the series and both the Great Intelligence and Yeti were retired. The Great Intelligence and its Yeti minions have since appeared in the 1990s Virgin Missing Adventures range of novels and the 1995 Reeltime spin-off production Downtime. The Great Intelligence returned in the 2012 Christmas Special "The Snowmen", where it is voiced by Sir Ian McKellen, which details the entity's origins. Richard E. Grant assumed the role in subsequent appearances in the seventh series of the revived show.

Appearances
Both the Great Intelligence and the Yeti appeared twice in the fifth season of the series as adversaries of the Doctor's second incarnation (Patrick Troughton). The 1967 serial The Abominable Snowmen depicts the Great Intelligence as having possessed the body of the High Lama Padmasamabhava (Wolfe Morris), ever since encountering the man on the astral plane some centuries ago. Using Padmasambhava the Great Intelligence moves small Yeti pieces around a chess-like map of the monastery and mountainside, with the Yeti protecting a cave hiding a pyramid of spheres that house the Great Intelligence. The Great Intelligence intends to create a physical body for itself, but these plans are foiled by the Doctor and his companions.

In the sequel The Web of Fear, aired in 1968 and set forty years after The Abominable Snowmen, the Great Intelligence returns when a control sphere is activated and enters a Yeti. The Great Intelligence uses an army of Yeti to take over the London Underground and begins filling London with a Web. The Great Intelligence primarily possesses the mind of Staff-Sergeant Arnold (Jack Woolgar) to sabotage the military resistance to the Yeti invasion. The invasion is revealed as a trap designed to draw in the Doctor so that the Great Intelligence can drain the Doctor's mind, but it is again defeated and banished.

The 2012 Eleventh Doctor (Matt Smith) episode "The Snowmen" provides an origin for the Great Intelligence, whose voice is provided by Sir Ian McKellen. It reveals that the Intelligence originated as a crystalline organism that looks like snow and responds to the thoughts of others. The snow-like organism became influenced by the thoughts of a young boy, Walter Simeon, during the 1800s, forming a mental symbiosis. From there, the Great Intelligence had the adult Dr. Simeon (Richard E. Grant) create "The Great Intelligence Institute" and orchestrate a scheme to obtain the DNA of a governess who froze to death in the Latimer family's pond. He intends to use her DNA to create ice-based lifeforms incapable of melting to take over the world. After the ice creature is destroyed, the Doctor uses a "memory worm" on Dr Simeon to erase his memories, expecting this to destroy the Intelligence. However, the Great Intelligence has existed long enough to become an independent entity and uses Simeon's brain-dead husk to attack the Doctor, briefly taking on the voice of the young Simeon (Cameron Strefford) during the confrontation. The intelligence withdraws from his vessel when the Latimer family cries for the dying Clara, triggering his snow to melt. It is implied these events lead to The Web of Fear as the Doctor shows a map of the London Underground from 1966 to the Great Intelligence.

The Great Intelligence appears in the 2013 episode "The Bells of Saint John", set in the present day. The Great Intelligence uses a woman called Miss Kizlet (Celia Imrie) to aid him in creating an organization based at the Shard to collect and harvest the minds of people using Wi-Fi for it to feed on. The Eleventh Doctor manages to upload Miss Kizlet into this "data cloud", forcing the workers to free the minds trapped in the data cloud and return them to their bodies. To preserve its secrecy and hinder UNIT's investigation, the Great Intelligence has Miss Kizlet wipe all memories of its existence from her and the other employees's memories. It communicated with humans on video screens using the likeness of Simeon.

In the Series 7 finale, "The Name of the Doctor", the Great Intelligence manifests through and manipulates dark creatures called the Whisper Men, changing the one it inhabits into the form of Dr Simeon. The Whispermen kidnap the Paternoster Gang, close associates of the Eleventh Doctor, taking them to Trenzalore, the site of the Doctor's future grave. Having thereby lured the Doctor to his own grave, the Great Intelligence gains access to Doctor's tomb (his future dead TARDIS), by threatening the lives of the Gang. It is revealed the Doctor's travels through time have created a temporal rift "body" inside the dead husk of the future TARDIS. The Great Intelligence claims that it plans on getting revenge on the Doctor for foiling its schemes by scattering itself along the Doctor's timeline. Through scattering itself, the Great Intelligence intends to overturn all of the Doctor's various victories and destroy him, even though this would destroy the Great Intelligence itself. After it has entered the rift, however, the Doctor's companion Clara Oswald follows him, likewise scattering herself along the timeline, saving the Doctor, who in turn enters his own timeline to rescue Clara. The Intelligence is presumed destroyed, though multiple versions of it are laced in the Doctor's timeline.

Spin-off appearances
The Great Intelligence and its Yeti servants are featured in the 1995 spin-off video film Downtime, produced by Reeltime and featuring Victoria Waterfield (Deborah Watling), the Brigadier (Nicholas Courtney) and Sarah Jane Smith (Elisabeth Sladen) with a now deceased Professor Travers (Jack Watling) serving as a vessel for the Intelligence. Here the Great Intelligence plans on infecting the Internet so as to use it as a new body, using control spheres to transform humans into Yeti servants. Downtime was novelised by Marc Platt as part of Virgin's Missing Adventures range in 1996.

The Great Intelligence also features in several novels (All-Consuming Fire, Millennial Rites, Business Unusual, The Quantum Archangel and Divided Loyalties) in which it is identified with H. P. Lovecraft's Yog-Sothoth, a being from the universe before this one.

The Great Intelligence also appeared in a back-up comic strip in Doctor Who Weekly Nos. 31–34.

Powers 
The Great Intelligence had no physical form and thus relied on possession of living creatures to manipulate its environment. It existed on the astral plane and could enter the people it encountered. It allowed Padmasambhava to live over 300 years while he created the Robot Yeti and it also reanimated dead bodies like Staff Sergeant Arnold. It had considerable mental powers such as mind control and could even mentally attack the Doctor, causing him great pain, and travel through time and space.

The Great Intelligence could also manifest itself in simple forms such as a slime that glowed brightly, a dense fog that consumed anything that entered it, and a poisonous web/fungus that could trap the Doctor's TARDIS and could not be destroyed by chemicals, explosives or flamethrowers.

Physical servants

Yeti

The Yeti were an effort by the production team to create more recurring antagonists for the Doctor in lieu of the Daleks, whose creator and part-copyright owner Terry Nation desired to have appear in an American spin-off series. Writers Henry Lincoln and Mervyn Haisman chose the stories of the yeti to base their new monster upon. The Yeti are controlled by the Great Intelligence through control spheres. These are depicted as capable of seeking out inactive Yeti, emitting a series of whistle-like beeps whilst doing so. The Web of Fear shows the characters experimenting upon one of the spheres and eventually able to control the Yeti it is stored within by using a short-range remote control.

Snowmen

In "The Snowmen", the Great Intelligence's first appearance in the internal chronology of the series, the Great Intelligence in the form of psychic snowflakes – animated snowmen across Victorian London to fight for it. In the course of the episode, it also reanimates and takes control of a woman who died by freezing to death in a pond, and later still possesses the brain-dead body of its aide Dr. Walter Simeon (Richard E. Grant) after he was bitten by a Memory Worm that wipes out all his memories.

Spoonheads
The Spoonheads are robots used by the Great Intelligence's operatives in "The Bells of Saint John" to harvest human minds for him to feast upon. They are also referred to as "Servers" by Miss Kizlet (Celia Imrie) and as walking Wi-Fi base stations by the Eleventh Doctor (Matt Smith). They have a spoon-shaped head through which they absorb a person's soul, and are able to disguise themselves as figures from the target's subconscious. Steven Moffat said that he wrote "The Bells of Saint John" as an "action rollercoaster", with the Spoonhead robots devised in contrast to other monsters he had created such as the Weeping Angels and Silence with a focus on scares. He has also said that the Spoonheads are not a critique on contemporary obsessions with technology and that the Wi-Fi concept was more of an invasion method new to Doctor Who.

Whisper Men
In "The Name of the Doctor", the Great Intelligence is assisted by the Whisper Men, invulnerable manifestations that whisper in rhymes. They appear as Victorian gentlemen, with no facial features other than mouths with sharp teeth. The Great Intelligence is able to physically manifest in place of any of the individual Whisper Men, taking the form of his last human host, Walter Simeon (Richard E. Grant). Their whispers are implied to be prophetic, when chasing the Doctor on Trenzalore, whispering rhymes such as: "the man who lies will lie no more, when this man lies at Trenzalore," and "This man must fall as all men must, the fate of all is always dust."  The rhymes often cryptically refer to past or future events that the Whisper Men had no obvious way of having knowing about.

Reception

Critic Graham Sleight commented in an analysis of Doctor Who monsters that the use of Yeti robots by the Great Intelligence was uninteresting as they provided merely a physical and voiceless threat. Some reviewers have seen this as a strength, with Nick Page feeling that the Yeti being controlled by the Great Intelligence gave them greater menace, arguing that because "the Great Intelligence... always turned off their power when it was not required", this creates suspense when the characters interacted with a dormant Yeti.

Ian McKellen's performance of the Great Intelligence's voice for its return in the 2012 Christmas Special was generally well received. Patrick Mulkern, writing for Radio Times, said "hats off to Steven Moffat" for reintroducing the character and described the casting of Ian McKellen as "a coup" and "wizardly". The character was seen by some reviewers as being underdeveloped, with Kyle Anderson of the Nerdist feeling that although McKellen and Richard E. Grant, who portrayed its human minion Dr Simeon, were excellent casting choices the Great Intelligence's plan was "the least fleshed out part of the script". Matt Risley's review on IGN similarly praised the acting of McKellen and Grant, but felt the story was "stuffed with ideas" and the Great Intelligence's return was overshadowed by the "fully formed and utterly unpredictable" performance of Jenna-Louise Coleman as Clara Oswald.

The character's appearance, portrayed by Richard E Grant, in "The Bells of Saint John", was perceived as establishing the Great Intelligence as a prominent antagonist for Series 7. Simon Brew felt that the Great Intelligence's appearance was "very welcome" and compared the character's use to that of Moriarty in Steven Moffat's series Sherlock. Mark Snow described the Great Intelligence in his review as a "Big Bad" and felt that the character's involvement tied nicely into the Spoonhead plot. Neela Debnath of The Independent, despite feeling that the episode was a "rehash" of elements of "Blink" and Sherlock, commented that it appeared to be establishing the groundwork for a battle between the Doctor and Great Intelligence.

List of appearances

Television
The Abominable Snowmen
The Web of Fear
"The Snowmen"
"The Bells of Saint John"
"The Name of the Doctor"

Comics
Yonder...the Yeti (Doctor Who Weekly #31-34)

Direct-to-video
Downtime

Novels
All-Consuming Fire
Millennial Rites
Business Unusual
The Quantum Archangel
Divided Loyalties

See also
 Yeti (Doctor Who)

Notes

External links

 The Great Intelligence at the official BBC Doctor Who website
 

Recurring characters in Doctor Who
Television characters introduced in 1967
Fictional parasites and parasitoids
Fictional telepaths
Doctor Who aliens
Fictional telekinetics